Lobogenesis magdalenana is a species of moth of the family Tortricidae. It is found in Colombia and Venezuela. The habitat consists of cloud forests.

The length of the forewings is 5 mm for males and 5.1–6.5 mm for females. The forewings are pale 
whitish with brown striae in distal part. The hindwings are whitish with pale grey-brown mottling.

Etymology
The species name refers to the province of Magdalena.

References

Moths described in 2000
Euliini